Blue Star Ferries is a brand name of Blue Star Maritime S.A. The company operates ferry services from the Greek mainland to the Aegean Islands.

Blue Star Ferries is the biggest ferry company in Greece, serving more than 20 destinations. Their fleet is composed of 12 modern ferries whose course speeds range from 23 to 30 knots.

History
Blue Star Ferries was founded in 1965 as Strintzis Lines by the Strintzis family from Lixouri, Kefalonia. The company was rebranded as Blue Ferries in 2000 following Attica Enterprises' acquisition of a 48% stake in the company. Blue Star Ferries is a sister company of Superfast Ferries, as both are part of the Attica Group and have had partnership in some routes, such as Rosyth to Zeebrugge and presently Piraeus-Heraklion.

In 2000 the company took delivery of two Ro-Ro (roll on/roll off) ferries built at the Dutch shipyard Van der Giessen de Noord.
 
In 2006 Blue Star Maritime S.A. purchased the Dodecanese ferry company DANE Sea Lines.

Blue Star Ferries ordered two ferry-type ships at Daewoo Shipyards in Korea. The first ferry, named Blue Star Delos, was delivered in the first 10 days of October 2011, and the second, Blue Star Patmos, in July 2012. Blue Star Delos is currently on the route Piraeus–Paros–Naxos–Ios–Thira, and Blue Star Patmos on the route Piraeus–Chios–Mytilini (Lesvos).

Fleet
Blue Star Ferries currently operates a fleet of 12 vessels.

Conventional ferries

Ro-Ro cargo ships

On charter to Irish ferries

Former fleet as Strinzis Lines
Kephalinia (1965-1993), scrapped as Zachara in 2005
Ionion (1972-1978), sank in Gramvousa, Crete in 1992
Ionian Star (1976-1990), scrapped as Tian Kun in 2001 
Ionian Glory (1981-1989), scrapped in 2012 at Alexandria, Egypt
Eptanisos (1984-2000), scrapped as Pollux 1 at Gadani Beach, Pakistan in 2004
Ionian Victory (1984-1986), scrapped as Jin Hu in 2004
Delos (1986-1997), scrapped in 2011
Ionian Sun (1986-2001), scrapped as Merdif in 2004 at Alang, India
Ionian Island (1987-2000), scrapped as Merdif 1 in 2010 at Alang, India
Ionian Galaxy (1987-2000), scrapped as Merdif 2 in 2011 at Alang, India
Ionian Fantasy (1988-1991): while serving as Ionian Sea (1991-1993), caught fire while laid up under the name Leros at Elefsina, Greece; scrapped at Aliağa, Turkey in 2001
Ionian Harmony (1989-1990), scrapped as Caly in 2013 at Alang, India
Superferry (1991-2001), serving as Mahabbah for Namma Lines since 2006 to be scrapped as Mahabba in Colombo 2021
Superferry II (1993-2000), serving as Superferry II for Golden Star Ferries since 2011, now as SuperStar for Seajets since 2021
Ionian Star (1994-1999), serving as Denia Ciutat Creativa for Balearia since 2016
Kefalonia (1995-2000), serving as Kefalonia for Levante Ferries since 2018
Ionian Bridge (1996-2000), scrapped as Duba in 2021 at Alang, India
Sea Jet 1 (1998-2000), serving as Super Jet for Seajets since 2004
Ionian Victory (1998-2000), scrapped as Ionian Sky in 2020 at Aliağa, Turkey
Sea Jet 2 (1999-2000), serving as Seajet 2 for Seajets since 2006
Superferry Hellas (1999-2000), serving as Blue Horizon for Blue Star Ferries since 2000

Former fleet as Blue Ferries, Blue Star Ferries
Blue Bridge (2000-2004), scrapped as Duba in 2021 at Alang, India
Blue Galaxy (2000-2001), scrapped as Merdif 2 in 2011 at Alang, India
Blue Island (2000-2001), scrapped as Merdif 1 in 2010 at Alang, India
Blue Sky (2000-2004), scrapped as Ionian Sky in 2020 at Aliağa, Turkey
Kefalonia (2000-2004), serving as Kefalonia for Levante Ferries since 2018
Sea Jet 1 (2000-2003), serving as Super Jet for Seajets since 2004
Sea Jet 2 (2000-2006), serving as Seajet 2 for Seajets since 2006
Blue Aegean (2001-2002), scrapped as Mahabba in 2021 at Colombo, Sri Lanka
Superferry II (2000-2011), serving as SuperStar for Seajets since 2021
Blue Star Ithaki (2000-2014), serving as MV Fundy Rose for Bay Ferries since 2014

Routes

Piraeus-Crete 
 Piraeus-Chania (Blue Galaxy & Blue Horizon)

Piraeus-Cyclades 

 Piraeus-Paros-Naxos-Ios-Santorini (Blue Star Delos)
 Piraeus-Paros-Naxos-Irakleia-Schoinousa-Koufonisia-Amorgos (Blue Star Naxos)
 Piraeus-Syros-Tinos-Mykonos (Blue Star Paros)

Piraeus-Dodecanese 

 Piraeus-Syros-Amorgos-Patmos-Leros-Kos-Rhodes (Blue Star 2)
 Piraeus-Astypalaia-Fournoi–Ikaria–Patmos-Leipsoi-Leros-Kalymnos-Kos-Nisyros-Tilos-Symi-Rhodes-Kasos-Karpathos-Kastellorizo (Blue Star Patmos)

Piraeus-Northeast Aegean Sea 

 Piraeus-Chios/Mesta-Mytilene (Diagoras)
 Piraeus-Syros-Patmos-Ikaria-Fournoi Korseon-Samos-Chios-Mytilene-Limnos-Kavala (Blue Star Chios)

Media
One of Blue Star Ferries' boats took the role of Princess Myrto on the Greek TV show Θα Σε Δω Στο Πλοίο (literally translated: I'll See You on the Ferry) broadcast by Alpha TV, a Greek channel, from 2000 to 2002. The majority of the filming for this series was on the boat itself except for on-location filming of the characters on holiday or on leave. This is still being broadcast in certain Greek-speaking countries, including Cyprus.

References

Παρουσίαση Blue Star Patmos 
Παρουσίαση Blue Star Delos

External links
Blue Star Ferries' ships videos

Ferry companies of Greece
Companies based in Athens
Transport companies established in 2000
Greek brands